Abbot Springs is a settlement in Shelby County, Alabama, USA. While the community was once unincorporated, it is now part of eastern Westover. It lies less than 3 miles away from the town of Harpersville. It runs along a branch of Old Highway 280.

Demographics
According to the census returns from 1850-2010 for Alabama, it has never reported a population figure separately on the U.S. Census.

References 

Unincorporated communities in Shelby County, Alabama
Unincorporated communities in Alabama
Neighborhoods in Alabama